Amin Taheri (born 26 June 1995) is an Iranian freestyle wrestler. He won his first world title in Zagreb at the Junior Wrestling World Championships, where he won a bronze medal in 120 kg. In the same year he won gold in Asian Junior Wrestling Championships. Next year, 2015, he was able to score a silver medal in the same category at Junior world championships in Brazil. In 2017 and 2018, He was able to win two consecutive bronze medals in Under 23 world championships.

He won a bronze medal at the 2018 Asian Wrestling Championships. He was also a member of the Iranian team in 2019 Wrestling World Cup in which the team came in second.

He Has also attended Takhti international cup a few times, in which he has won two bronze medals in 2015 and 2019, and a silver in 2020.

References

Living people
People from Tehran
Iranian male sport wrestlers
1995 births
Asian Wrestling Championships medalists
20th-century Iranian people
21st-century Iranian people